George Washington Geddes (July 16, 1824 – November 9, 1892) was an American lawyer, jurist, and politician who served as a U.S. representative from Ohio for four terms from 1879 to 1887.

Early life and career 
Born in Mount Vernon, Ohio, Geddes attended the common schools.
He studied law under Columbus Delano.
He was admitted to the bar in July 1845 and practiced.
He served as judge of the court of common pleas of the sixth judicial district in 1856.
He was reelected in 1861.

Geddes was again elected in 1868, and served until 1873.
He resumed the practice of law.
He was an unsuccessful Democratic candidate for judge of the Supreme Court of Ohio in 1871.
He resumed the practice of law in Mansfield.

Congress 
Geddes was elected as a Democrat to the Forty-sixth and to the three succeeding Congresses (March 4, 1879 – March 3, 1887).
He served as chairman of the Committee on War Claims (Forty-eighth and Forty-ninth Congresses).
He declined to be a candidate for reelection in 1886 to the Fiftieth Congress.
He resumed the practice of his profession.

Family life 
Married Nancy Lennon of Ashland County, Ohio in 1848, and had three sons, Samuel, James and George. Nancy died in 1878, and Geddes married Amelia Gass, December 1880.
 
Geddes was a trustee of Ohio Wesleyan University and Mount Union College. He was a Methodist.

Death
He died in Mansfield, Ohio, November 9, 1892. He was interred in Mansfield Cemetery.

Sources

1824 births
1892 deaths
People from Mount Vernon, Ohio
Ohio lawyers
Politicians from Mansfield, Ohio
19th-century American politicians
19th-century American lawyers
Democratic Party members of the United States House of Representatives from Ohio